Angelo De Martini (24 January 1897 – 17 August 1979) was an Italian racing cyclist and Olympic champion in track cycling.

Biography
Martini was born in Villafranca di Verona. He received a gold medal in team pursuit at the 1924 Summer Olympics in Paris. He died in Verona, aged 82.

References

External links
 
 
 
 
 

1897 births
1979 deaths
Italian male cyclists
Olympic gold medalists for Italy
Cyclists at the 1924 Summer Olympics
Olympic cyclists of Italy
Italian track cyclists
Olympic medalists in cycling
People from Villafranca di Verona
Cyclists from the Province of Verona
Medalists at the 1924 Summer Olympics
20th-century Italian people